Trinidad and Tobago at the Pan American Games.

Medal count

References